Theresa Bielinski Gerratana is a former member of the Connecticut State Senate, serving from 2011 to 2019. She was first elected in a special election on February 22, 2011, to represent the citizens of New Britain, Berlin and Farmington. In November 2014, Gerratana was reelected by her constituents to serve a third term. She served as co-chair of the Public Health Committee and vice-chair of the Government Administration and Elections Committee.

Gerratana first served in the Connecticut General Assembly as a member of the state House of Representatives for ten years, from 1993 to 2003. During her time in the House, Gerratana served as co-chair of the Human Services Committee.

Gerratana left her role in the Senate to join the Office of Health Strategy after being nominated by Governor Ned Lamont in 2019.

References 
 State Senator Terry Gerratana, accessed July 10, 2015
 Gerratana, Terry, accessed January 2, 2014
 Theresa Bielinski 'Terry' Gerratana's Political Summary, accessed January 2, 2014
 Hartford Courant, 6th Senate District: Gerratana Wins, February 22, 2011

Democratic Party Connecticut state senators
Living people
1949 births
Women state legislators in Connecticut
21st-century American politicians
21st-century American women politicians
Politicians from New Britain, Connecticut